Czapla is a Polish surname. It may refer to:

 Krzysztof Czapla (born 1956), Polish diplomat
 Łukasz Czapla (born 1982), Polish sport shooter
 Marian Czapla (1946–2016), Polish painter and graphic artist

See also
 

Polish-language surnames